Thomas or Tom Forman may refer to:

Thomas Marsh Forman (1809–1875), American Confederate politician
Tom Forman (footballer) (1879 – after 1910), British footballer
Thomas Forman (priest) (1885–1965), Archdeacon of Lindisfarne
Thomas Forman (reformer) (died 1528), early English reformer
Thomas Seaton Forman (1791–1850), British Conservative politician
Tom Forman (actor) (1893–1926), American film actor, writer and producer

Tom Forman (cartoonist) (1936–1996), American comic strip cartoonist
Tom Forman (producer) (fl. 2002), television producer

See also
Tom Foreman (born 1959), broadcast journalist